Iván de Nova Ruiz (born 22 September 1996 in Miami Platja) is a Spanish professional footballer who plays for CF Villanovense. Mainly a left back, he can also play as a central defender.

Club career
Born in Tarragona, Catalonia, de Nova represented Gimnàstic de Tarragona as a youth. On 22 August 2015 he was loaned to Tercera División club FC Ascó, making his senior debut during the campaign.

Upon returning from loan, de Nova was assigned to the farm team also in the fourth level, and renewed his contract until 2020 on 7 August 2017. He made his professional debut on 12 September 2018, starting in a 0–2 away loss against Córdoba CF, for the season's Copa del Rey.

De Nova was released on 14 June 2019, as his contract expired. On 18 July 2019, he signed with CF Villanovense.

References

External links

1996 births
Living people
Sportspeople from Tarragona
Spanish footballers
Footballers from Catalonia
Association football defenders
Tercera División players
CF Pobla de Mafumet footballers
Gimnàstic de Tarragona footballers
CF Villanovense players